Trevino Betty (born 10 October 1971) is a retired Canadian sprinter who specialized in the 100 metres.

With the Canadian relay team he competed at the 1999 World Championships, but the team was disqualified in the heat. He however helped in winning a relay silver medal at the 1998 Commonwealth Games and at the 1999 Pan American Games.

His personal best time was 10.27 seconds, achieved in August 1999 in Monachil.

Betty also became Canadian long jump champion in 1996.

References

External links
 
 
 

1974 births
Living people
Canadian male sprinters
Canadian male long jumpers
Black Canadian track and field athletes
Athletes (track and field) at the 1994 Commonwealth Games
Athletes (track and field) at the 1998 Commonwealth Games
Commonwealth Games silver medallists for Canada
Athletes (track and field) at the 1999 Pan American Games
Pan American Games track and field athletes for Canada
Pan American Games silver medalists for Canada
World Athletics Championships athletes for Canada
Commonwealth Games medallists in athletics
Pan American Games medalists in athletics (track and field)
Medalists at the 1999 Pan American Games
Medallists at the 1998 Commonwealth Games